The 52 members of the Parliament of Vanuatu from 2008 to 2012 were elected on 2 September 2008.

List of members

References

 2008